The Estadio Nido del Colibri (English: Hummingbird's Nest Stadium) was a planned multi-use stadium in Cuernavaca, Mexico. It was originally intended to be used as the home stadium of Colibríes de Morelos, a short-lived football team in Mexico. The stadium was to have a capacity of 35,000 and 112 box seats.

Origins
In December 2002, it was announced that the team of Celaya would relocate to Cuernavaca in the state of Morelos to form Colibries de Morelos, owned by Jorge Rodriguez Marié. The city did not have a home stadium, but they were able to use Estadio Mariano Matamoros located in nearby Xochitepec for most of 2003. The stadium was the smallest stadium in Liga MX, housing 16,000 people. Marié, the proprietor of Colibries, planned on giving the team a new stadium once they settled in the Primera División de Mexico for a couple seasons.

Concept
Not much was revealed about the stadium size or architecture, but the stadium was to have a capacity of 35,000. The facility was also meant to house four practice fields, a smaller stadium for a possible academy team, a restaurant, and a clubhouse nearby.

See also 
 Estadio Centenario (Cuernavaca)

References 

Nido del Colibri
Sports venues in Morelos